2-Methoxy-4-vinylphenol is an aromatic substance used as a flavoring agent. It is one of the compounds responsible for the natural aroma of buckwheat.

Some insects such as Rhynchophorus ferrugineus (Red palm weevil) use this substance for chemical signaling (pheromones).

The aroma of pure substance was described as: apple, spicy, peanut, wine-like or clove and curry.

Ferulic acid is converted to 2-methoxy-4-vinylphenol by certain strains of yeast, notably strains used in brewing of wheat beers, such as phenolic (POF+) strains of Saccharomyces cerevisiae (brewer's yeast) which gives beers such as Weissbier and Wit their distinctive spicy "clove" flavor. Various other microbes, including Torulaspora delbrueckii and Pseudomonas fluorescens are also able to convert ferulic acid into 2-methoxy-4-vinylphenol.

References 

O-methylated natural phenols
Insect pheromones
Vanilloids
Vinyl compounds